Elections for Havering London Borough Council were held on 2 May 2002.  

In London council elections the entire council is elected every four years, opposed to some local elections where one councillor is elected every year for three of the four years. Gains or losses of seats are not applicable in this election due to the reduction of seats from the last election in 1998.

Summary of results

References

2002
2002 London Borough council elections